Vice Admiral Thomas J. Moore (born 1959) was a senior officer in the United States Navy. He retired from active duty on June 19, 2020, after 39 years of service. He currently serves as Vice President of Nuclear Operations at Huntington Ingalls Industries.

Early life and education
Moore graduated from the United States Naval Academy in 1981 with a Bachelor of Science in math and operations analysis. He also holds a degree in information systems management from George Washington University and a Master of Science and an engineer's degree in nuclear engineering from the Massachusetts Institute of Technology.

Career 
Additionally, ashore he served two years as a company officer at the United States Naval Academy.

In April 2008, Moore reported to the staff of the chief of Naval Operations as the deputy director, Fleet Readiness, Office of the Chief of Naval Operations (OPNAV) N43B. From May 2010 to July 2011, he served as the director, Fleet Readiness, OPNAV N43.

Moore commanded the Program Executive Office for Aircraft Carriers from August 11, 2011, to June 1, 2016. Over this five-year period, he led the largest ship acquisition program in the U.S. Navy portfolio; was responsible for designing, building, testing and delivering Ford-class aircraft carriers; led the Navy's first-ever inactivation of a nuclear-powered aircraft carrier, ; and was the lead in the U.S.-India Joint Working Group Aircraft Carrier Technology Cooperation.

Moore became the 44th commander of Naval Sea Systems Command (NAVSEA) June 10, 2016. As NAVSEA commander, he oversaw a global workforce of more than 74,000 military and civilian personnel responsible for the development, delivery and maintenance of the Navy's ships, submarines and systems. Moore retired from military service in June 2020.

Moore's personal awards include the Navy Distinguished Service Medal, Legion of Merit (three awards), Meritorious Service Medal (four awards), and the Navy and Marine Corps Commendation Medal.

In January 2021, Moore was named Vice President of Nuclear Operations at Huntington Ingalls Industries, the United States' only manufacturer of nuclear-powered aircraft carriers.

References

1959 births
Living people
United States Naval Academy alumni
George Washington University School of Engineering and Applied Science alumni
MIT School of Engineering alumni
United States Navy admirals
Recipients of the Legion of Merit
Recipients of the Navy Distinguished Service Medal
NAVSEA commanders